Eugène Berger (4 December 1960 – 21 January 2020) was a politician from Luxembourg.  Berger studied to become a teacher, and worked in this profession from 1988 to 1994. In 1994, he was elected to the Chamber of Deputies for the Democratic Party. He was State Secretary of the Environment from 1999 to 2004.

On 1 October 1992, he became the first Luxembourger to climb Mount Everest, for which he won the title of Luxembourgish Sportsman of the Year.  He had two children.

References

External links
Biography on Luxembourg government site
Everest Summiteers

1960 births
2020 deaths
Members of the Chamber of Deputies (Luxembourg)
Members of the Chamber of Deputies (Luxembourg) from Sud
Democratic Party (Luxembourg) politicians
Luxembourgian educators
Summiters of Mount Everest
People from Bettembourg
Luxembourgian mountain climbers